This is a list of the schools and colleges in Dharmapuri district, Tamil Nadu, India.

Many educational institutions in Dharmapuri District have opened in the 21st century. Dharmapuri district  was one of Tamil Nadu's lowest-performing districts in 2011, with a literacy rate of 62.5%. By 2016, the literacy rate had increased to 92.5% and was ranked as 15th among the state's 32 districts. As of May 2021, the Dharmapuri district had over 50 colleges and over 300 schools, including government-funded and private schools.

Schools

CBSE schools
The district has more than 28 CBSE schools, both government and private. The list includes:
Advaith International Academy
Asian Christian High School
Avvai Vidhyashram Public School
Cambridge Public E-school
Dawn Shikshalaya Public School
Dheeran Chinnamalai International Residential School
Eden Garden English School
Harur International School
Indian Public School
Kamalam International School
Kendirya Vidyalaya
Litera Valley Zee School
Maharishi Vidya Mandir Sr Sec School
Mathakondapalli Model School
Nalanda International Public School
Kethureddipatti Government High School
Open Arms Matriculation School
Sassi Gnanodaya Academy
Senthil Public School
Shemford School
Sivam International School
Sri Ram Public School
Sri Vijay Vidyashram
St.arokia Annai School
Taruwin Vidhya Mandir School
The Ashok Leyland School
The Vijay Millennium School
Tvs Academy
Vailankanni Public School

State board schools
These schools follow the syllabus of the Tamil Nadu State Board. Popular schools include:

ERK Higher Secondary School, Erumiyampatti
Sri Vijay vidyalaya Matric school, Pennagaram road
Bharathi Vidyalaya
Sri Vijay vidyalaya Matric school, Gandhinagar
Senthil Matric school, Near city park
Pachanmuthu Matric school, Near GDMC
Dawn Matric school, S.V.Road, Dharmapuri.
Indian Matric school, Morapur road
Don Bosco Matric school, Bengaluru -Dharmapuri NH, Gundalpatti 
Sri vidya Mandir, Palacode Town
Sacred Heart Matric school, Sellyiampatti 
Paramveer Hi-tech, Dharmapuri Road, pauparapatti. 
Bharathi Vidyalaya High School, Veppampatty
Paramveer Matric Hr sec school Dharmapur
Sri Ram Vidyalaya High Tech Modern School, Kalanikattur, Nagarkoodal, Dharmapuri-Dt.

Colleges

Medical colleges 
The District has only one Government medical college.
 Government Dharmapuri Medical college, Dharmapuri

Paramedical colleges 
The District's paramedical colleges are:<ref>{{Cite web|last=indcareer.com|date=1970-01-01|title=List of Medical Colleges In Dharmapuri, Tamil Nadu
 ERK Institute of Paramedical Science - Diplomo in Health Inspector
 ERK School of Nursing-ANM
 ERK College of Pharmacy
Padmavathi College of Nursing
Pachamuthu College of Nursing
AMS College of Nursing
Vijay College of Nursing
Vijay College of Pharmacy
Padmavathi College of Pharmacy

Engineering Colleges
*Government College of Engineering, Dharmapuri
Jayalakshmi Institute of Technology (Affiliated to Anna University, Chennai)
Shreenivasa Engineering College (Affiliated to Anna University, Chennai)

Polytechnic Colleges
Marutham Nelli Polytechnic College
Paramveer Polytechnic College
Moogambigai Polytechnic College

College of Education
E.R.K College of Education (Women) (Approved by NCTE and Affiliated to TNTEU)
Sri Vijay Vidyalaya College of Education (Affiliated to Tamil Nadu Teachers Education University (TNTEU), Chennai)
Saya Ghosh College of Education (TNTEU)
Don Bosco College of Education and Research Institute (DBCERI) (TNTEU)
Samy College of Education (TNTEU)
Varuvan Vadivelan College of Education (TNTEU)
Siva College of Education (TNTEU)
Annai India College of Education (TNTEU)
Vishwa Bharati College of Education (TNTEU)
Paspo College of Education (TNTEU)
Adiparasakthi Teacher Training Institute (TNTEU)
Anna Arivagam College of Education (TNTEU)
Christ College of Education for Women (TNTEU)
Velammal College of Education (TNTEU)
Shri Vijay Vidhyalaya College of Education (TNTEU)
Shri Gokulakrishna College of Education (TNTEU)
Girivasan College of Education (TNTEU)
PDR Vellachiammal College of Education (TNTEU)
Sri Vidhya Mandhir College of Education (TNTEU)
Stanley College of Education (TNTEU)
Thalapathy College of Education (TNTEU)
Paramveer College of Education (TNTEU)
Pachamuthu College of Education (TNTEU)
Jaisakthi College of Education (TNTEU)
Raadha College of Education (TNTEU)
PDR College of Education (TNTEU)
Annai College of Education (TNTEU)
Paramveer College of Education

Arts and science colleges
 ERK Arts and Science College
Government Arts and Science College, Dharmapuri.
Pee Gee College of Arts and Science (Affiliated to Periyar University, Salem)

References 

Dharmapuri
Education in Dharmapuri district